Roméo Fortin (May 16, 1886 – August 16, 1953) was a Canadian provincial politician.

Born in Montreal, Quebec, Fortin was the member of the Legislative Assembly of Quebec for Châteauguay-Laprairie from 1939 to 1944.

References

1886 births
1953 deaths
Politicians from Montreal
Quebec Liberal Party MNAs